Noer Alie (15 July 1914 – 29 January 1992) was an Islamic leader and educator who is now regarded as a National Hero of Indonesia.

References

1914 births
1992 deaths
National Heroes of Indonesia